Lorna "Nanna Nungala" Fejo (14 June 1930 – 25 February 2022) was a Warumungu woman named by the Prime Minister of Australia, Kevin Rudd, in his historic Apology to the Stolen Generations, on 13 February 2008.

At four years of age, she was forcibly removed from her family and community at Tennant Creek. She never again saw her mother, who died before Fejo was able to leave institutional care. Fejo was initially sent to The Bungalow (in Alice Springs), and was later sent to Methodist missions on Goulburn Island and then Croker Island. 

Fejo was allowed to leave the mission at age sixteen, to take a domestic job in Darwin. 

Since 1973 Fejo has been a member of the Church of Jesus Christ of Latter-day Saints.

In 1998 Fejo was given the Australian Medical Association's Best Individual Contribution to Healthcare in Australia Award, for her contribution as the coordinator of the Strong Women, Strong Babies, Strong Culture program in the Northern Territory.

In 2000 Fejo was awarded the Centenary Medal, for services to the Aboriginal community.

There is a brief biography of Fejo on the Northern Territory Library's Territory Women website.

Fejo died on 25 February 2022, at the age of 91.

References

1930 births
2022 deaths
Australian Latter Day Saints
Converts to Mormonism
Members of the Stolen Generations